The 2018 Kentucky Christian Knights football team represented Kentucky Christian University in the 2018 NAIA football season. The Knights will play their home games at KCU Field, in Grayson, Kentucky. Kentucky Christian competes in the Bluegrass Division of the Mid-South Conference. The team is led by second-year head coach Corey Fipps.

Schedule

References

Kentucky Christian
Kentucky Christian Knights football seasons
Kentucky Christian Knights football